Jack Hosking (31 December 1931 – 25 July 1998) was an Australian rules footballer who played with Carlton in the Victorian Football League (VFL).

Notes

External links 

Jack Hosking's profile at Blueseum

1931 births
1998 deaths
Carlton Football Club players
Australian rules footballers from Victoria (Australia)
South Bendigo Football Club players